S750 may refer to :
 Canon S750, a Canon S Series digital camera
 Sanyo S750 and S750i, two Sanyo mobile phones marketed in the United Kingdom
 DSC-S750, a Sony Cyber-shot camera model
 Lenovo S750 camera-mobile phone